Dubnica Air was an airline based in Dubnica, Slovakia.

Fleet
The airline flew:
Let-410 turbo-lets
Cessna P210
Z-37 Cmelak
Robinson R44

Accidents and incidents
Two Dubnica Air Let-410s collided on August 20, 2015, killing 7 passengers.

External links

Defunct airlines of Slovakia
Airlines established in 2003
Airlines disestablished in 2016
Slovakian companies established in 2003